David Donohue (born January 5, 1967 in Morristown, New Jersey) is an American race car driver formerly active in the Grand-Am's Rolex Sports Car Series Daytona Prototype class for Action Express Racing and participant in the Pikes Peak races.

Career
The son of racing legend Mark Donohue, David Donohue has accomplished much in a wide variety of auto racing series and classes, including NASCAR's Busch Series and Craftsman Truck Series, as well as winning the GT2 class at the 1998 running of the 24 Hours of Le Mans. Almost exactly 40 years after his father won the 24 Hours of Daytona, David won the 2009 event driving a Brumos-entered Riley-Porsche teamed with Antonio García, Darren Law and Buddy Rice. After starting the race from pole position, Donohue's 0.167-second margin of victory over Juan Pablo Montoya was the closest in the race's history by over a minute, and the closest finish in the history of major international 24-hour motorsports events. In 2013, David Donohue drove in the first GX class race at the 24 hour of Daytona. His car, the #16 Napleton Porsche Cayman S, won by a 9 lap lead.

Motorsports career results

North American Touring Car Championship
(key)

24 Hours of Le Mans results

Pikes Peak International Hill Climb 
Donohue continues to race in the annual Pikes Peak Hill Climb in Colorado.

References

External links
 
 Grand-Am biographical sketch and career highlights

1967 births
24 Hours of Daytona drivers
24 Hours of Le Mans drivers
American Le Mans Series drivers
FIA GT Championship drivers
Rolex Sports Car Series drivers
Indy Lights drivers
Living people
NASCAR drivers
Sportspeople from Newark, New Jersey
Racing drivers from New Jersey
North American Touring Car Championship drivers

Oreca drivers
PacWest Racing drivers
Action Express Racing drivers
Andretti Autosport drivers